The Karnataka State Film Award for Best Dubbing Artist (Male) is one of the Karnataka State Film Awards presented annually since 2005 by the government of Karnataka for Kannada films.

Winners

References

2004 establishments in Karnataka
Karnataka State Film Awards
Voice acting awards